The 2001 Women's South American Volleyball Championship was the 24th edition of the Women's South American Volleyball Championship, organised by South America's governing volleyball body, the Confederación Sudamericana de Voleibol (CSV). It was held in Morón, Buenos Aires, Argentina

Teams 
Due to a conflict between the Peruvian Volleyball Federation and the FIVB, this is the only edition where the red-and-whites have not participated in the South American tournament. So far, the powerful Peruvian women's national volleyball team has won at least a medal in every edition they have participated.

Competition System
The competition system for the 2001 Women's South American Championship consisted of three rounds, with Brazil, Argentina and Venezuela automatically playing the second round, the other four teams played a single Round-Robin system. Each team played once against each of the 3 remaining teams. Points were accumulated during the first round and the top team advanced to second round. The second round saw another Round-Robin pool, points were again accumulated during the second round and the top two team advanced to play for the gold while the bottom two teams played for bronze.

First round

Standings

Matches

|}

Second round

Standings

|}

|}

Final round

Third place

|}

First place

|}

Final standing

References

Women's South American Volleyball Championships
South American Volleyball Championships
Volleyball
2001 in South American sport
International volleyball competitions hosted by Argentina
September 2001 sports events in South America